Steven Lee Zinter (September 18, 1950 – October 30, 2018) was an American lawyer who served as an associate justice of the South Dakota Supreme Court.

Early life and education
Zinter was born in Minneapolis, Minnesota, on September 18, 1950, and attended the University of South Dakota, receiving his Bachelor of Science in 1972 and his Juris Doctor in 1975.

Legal career
He did not take the bar exam as he was admitted to the South Dakota bar under the state's diploma privilege. He opened a private practice in Pierre, served as an Assistant Attorney General of South Dakota for the state, and served as Hughes County State's Attorney. In 1987 Zinter was appointed a circuit court judge and became presiding judge of the sixth judicial circuit in 1997. Zinter also served as trustee of the South Dakota Retirement System and president of the South Dakota Judges Association. South Dakota Governor Bill Janklow appointed him to the state supreme court on April 2, 2002.

Death
Zinter died on October 30, 2018 in Cannon Falls, Minnesota, from complications from surgery at the Mayo Clinic, in Rochester, Minnesota at the age of 68.

References

1950 births
2018 deaths
Lawyers from Minneapolis
University of South Dakota alumni
South Dakota lawyers
South Dakota state court judges
Justices of the South Dakota Supreme Court
People from Pierre, South Dakota
University of South Dakota School of Law alumni
21st-century American judges
20th-century American judges
20th-century American lawyers